Treaty of Ankara may refer to:

Treaty of Ankara (1921)
Treaty of Ankara (1926) also known as The Frontier Treaty of 1926
Treaty of Ankara (1963) also known as the Ankara Agreement

See also
 Ankara Agreement, 1963